Hirokazu Shiranita (白仁田 寛和, born October 2, 1985) is a Japanese professional baseball pitcher for the Orix Buffaloes in Japan's Nippon Professional Baseball. He was drafted in the first round of the 2007 University/Adult Draft by the Hanshin Tigers after graduating from Fukuoka University. Shiranita made 4 appearances in 7 years for Hanshin, recording 1 win and a 3.00 ERA. At the end of the 2014 season he was traded to the Orix Buffaloes for Kentaro Kuwahara.

References

External links

NPB

1985 births
Living people
Baseball people from Fukuoka Prefecture
Nippon Professional Baseball pitchers
Orix Buffaloes players
Hanshin Tigers players
Canberra Cavalry players
Japanese expatriate baseball players in Australia